Raymond Joseph Colfar (4 December 1935 – 31 December 2020) was an English professional footballer who played in the Football League, as a left winger.

Career
Colfar was born in Liverpool, Lancashire but began his career at Epsom & Ewell in 1955–56 before signing for Sutton United and in November 1958, signed for Crystal Palace then playing in the Fourth Division. Over the next three seasons he made 41 league appearances, scoring six times. He made only five appearances in the 1960–61 season when Palace were promoted and at the end of the season, moved on to Cambridge United.

References

External links

Colfar at holmesdale.net

1935 births
2020 deaths
Footballers from Liverpool
English footballers
Association football wingers
Sutton United F.C. players
Crystal Palace F.C. players
Oxford United F.C. players
Cambridge United F.C. players
Guildford City F.C. players
Wimbledon F.C. players
English Football League players
Epsom & Ewell F.C. players